The 2017–18 Stetson Hatters men's basketball team represented Stetson University during the 2017–18 NCAA Division I men's basketball season. The Hatters, led by fifth-year head coach Corey Williams, played their home games at the Edmunds Center in DeLand, Florida as members of the Atlantic Sun Conference. They finished the season 12–20, 4–10 in ASUN play to finish in seventh place. They lost in the quarterfinals of the ASUN tournament to Lipscomb.

Previous season 
The Hatters finished the 2016–17 season 11–21, 3–11 in ASUN play to finish in a tie for seventh place. They lost in the quarterfinals of the ASUN tournament to Florida Gulf Coast.

Offseason

Departures

Incoming transfers

2017 recruiting class

Roster

Schedule and results

 
|-
!colspan=9 style=| Regular season

|-
!colspan=9 style=| Atlantic Sun tournament

References

Stetson Hatters men's basketball seasons
Stetson
Stetson Hatters
Stetson Hatters